Trevor Kronemann (born September 3, 1968) is a former professional tennis player from the United States.

Kronemann enjoyed most of his tennis success while playing doubles. During his career, he won six doubles titles and finished as a runner-up five times.  He achieved a career-high doubles ranking of World No. 19 in 1995.

Career finals

Doubles: 11 (6 wins, 5 losses)

Doubles performance timeline

References

External links
 
 

American male tennis players
People from Edina, Minnesota
Tennis people from Minnesota
UC Irvine Anteaters men's tennis players
Living people
1968 births